Randall Edward Presley (1919–2012) was a real estate developer who has been called "one of California's top home builders." He was responsible for developing over 160 communities in Maryland, Virginia, Illinois, New Mexico, Arizona and California.

Career
Presley was born in Pensacola, Florida in 1919. He did "light construction work" there before moving to New York City to work as a model. During World War II he served in the United States Army Air Forces as a bombardier and a pilot, and as a flight instructor, at Thunderbird Field in Glendale, Arizona and at a base in Orange County, California. After the war he moved to Bakersfield and began a career as a real estate broker and later moved into construction. His first project was construction 12 houses on 3 acres. In 1956 he founded the Presley Development Company (later Presley Cos.). In 1961, following the death of his wife, Presley married Cecilia "Cece" DeMille,  a granddaughter of movie icon Cecil B. DeMille.

Seeing the rapid growth of Southern California he moved to Newport Beach in 1963 with his family. "His success was based in part on 'smart land-buying strategy' and the designing of complete communities with a variety of housing and amenities such as golf courses or tennis courts, The Times reported in 1984. At the time, the company had about 40 projects underway in California, Arizona and New Mexico. One of his developments, the equestrian-oriented Nellie Gail Ranch in Laguna Hills, has been called 'the Beverly Hills of Orange County.'" In June 1969, the Presley Development Company became a publicly traded company. Another part of his success was the quality of his homes "'What you do is set the standards and make darn sure they’re followed!", he is quoted as saying. A third factor was honesty in advertising. "Presley ads listed the lowest and highest price in each subdivision and included quality maps that showed where properties truly were."

In December 1984 Presley merged his company with the Pacific Lighting Company.

Randall Presley died at age 93 on April 12, 2012 at Hoag Hospital in Orange County from "complications arising from pneumonia."

Philanthropy
Presley "funded the construction of the Cecil B. DeMille Research Room at USC's Doheny Library," in honor of his wife's grandfather. In 1985 he received the City of Hope Award, "The Spirit of Life," granted by Orange County Construction Industries Alliance for the City of Hope. He contributed to numerous other organizations including the Sea Scouts and the Salvation Army.

Ahwatukee
One of Presley's significant projects was Ahwatukee Foothills, Arizona, "the largest and riskiest development project of Presley’s career." The project encompassed over two thousand acres of what was then farmland south of Phoenix, Arizona. Originally envisioned as a golf course retirement community named "Foothill Park," the project was changed to include both retirees and young families. Ground was broken in 1972. Later 640 acres at the base of South Mountain was added as a projected "custom home section." "At its peak in 1984, Ahwatukee houses were selling at the rate of more than one per day." To attract potential buyers, in 1979 Presley built the "House of the Future," designed by the Frank Lloyd Wright Foundation, featuring an early home automation system. Tours of the House were available between 1980 and 1984.

In 1973, one resident encountered Presley at the Ahwatukee Recreation Center:[He] took her hand, looked her in the eyes, and asked softly, "Are you happy here?" When the [resident] enthusiastically answered in the affirmative, Presley's smile made further words unnecessary.

References

External links
 California Homebuilding Association 1987 honoree

1919 births
2012 deaths
American construction businesspeople
American real estate businesspeople
People from Orange County, California
United States Army Air Forces pilots of World War II